The Green Islands is a small archipelago of islands in the Solomon Sea, within the Autonomous Region of Bougainville, in northeastern Papua New Guinea.

During World War II the United States Navy's Seabees built a large PT Boat base on the Green Islands.

Islands
Nissan Island — the largest island of the group
Pinipel Island
Barahun Island
Sirot Island
Sau Island

See also
 Battle of the Green Islands

References

External links
 Map including the Green Islands

Archipelagoes of Papua New Guinea
Geography of the Autonomous Region of Bougainville